These are the official results of the men's 1500 metres event at the 1983 IAAF World Championships in Helsinki, Finland. There were a total number of 52 participating athletes, with four qualifying heats, two semi-finals and the final held on Sunday 14 August 1983.

Records
Existing records at the start of the event.

Results

Qualifying heats
The qualifying heats took place on 12 August, with the 52 athletes involved being splitted into 4 heats. The first 4 athletes in each heat ( Q ) and the next 8 fastest ( q ) qualified for the semifinals. 

Heat 1
 

Heat 2
 

Heat 3
 

Heat 4

Semi-finals
The semifinals took place on 13 August, with the 25 athletes involved being splitted into 2 heats. The first 4 athletes in each heat ( Q ) and the next 4 fastest ( q ) qualified for the final. 

Heat 1

Heat 2

Final
The final took place on August 14.

References
 Results
 Results - World Athletics

1500 metres at the World Athletics Championships
Events at the 1983 World Championships in Athletics